Sebastian Halgasch (born 20 December 1980 in Dresden) is a backstroke swimmer from Germany, who won the bronze medal in the 50m Backstroke at the European SC Championships 1999 in Lisbon, Portugal. A couple of months later, at the 2000 FINA Short Course World Championships in Athens, Greece, he captured the silver medal in the 4x100 Medley Relay, alongside Björn Nowakowski, Thomas Rupprath, and Stefan Herbst.  In 2001 he won the FINA Swimming World Cup in the 50m Backstroke and 100m Individual Medley.

See also
 German records in swimming

References

1980 births
Living people
German male swimmers
Male backstroke swimmers
Swimmers from Dresden
Medalists at the FINA World Swimming Championships (25 m)
20th-century German people
21st-century German people